Salmon Mountain may refer to:

 Salmon Mountain (Alaska)
 Salmon Mountain (Arkansas)
 Salmon Mountain (California)
 Salmon Mountain (Idaho)
 Salmon Mountain (New Hampshire)
 Salmon Mountain (Oregon)